stylized as BanG Dream! Girls Band Party! ☆ PICO and also known as Garupa ☆ Pico, is a Japanese chibi short anime series by Bushiroad. Animated by Sanzigen in collaboration with DMM.futureworks, it is a spin-off of the main BanG Dream! series with characters from the mobile game BanG Dream! Girls Band Party!. , the show consists of three seasons.

The first season aired from July 5 to December 27, 2018, with episodes being aired live on the BanG Dream! TV variety show, Tokyo MX, SUN, and online on YouTube. Consisting of 26 three-minute episodes, the show aired from July to December.
 
A second season titled  aired from May 7 to October 29, 2020. The episodes were live streamed on YouTube and Periscope for BanG Dream! TV. The 26-episode season ran from May to October.

 aired from October 7, 2021 to March 31, 2022.

The first two themes were released as singles on August 22, 2018 and August 12, 2020, respectively; "Quintuple Smile" and "TWINKLE CiRCLE", both of which are theme songs for the game, were coupling tracks. "Pico! Papi! Girls Band Party! PICO!!!" peaked at tenth on the Oricon Weekly Singles Chart, while "One Extra Large! Garupa Pico" topped at 13th. Elements Garden's Ryota Suemasu and Asuka Oda were the composer and lyricist for the first theme, respectively, and Junpei Fujita took over composition for the second.

Seiya Miyajima serves as the director and animated character designer for both seasons, while Takaaki Kidani is the executive producer. Elements Garden oversees music production, with Noriyasu Agematsu and Fujita as producers. Sanzigen and Dmm.futureworks are assisted with animation by Passione and Creators in Pack. The voice actresses from the parent BanG Dream! anime reprise their roles for Pico.

A manga based on the show, BanG Dream! Garupa Pico Comic Anthology, was released on March 14, 2019 by Bushiroad and Kadokawa Corporation. The anthology features comics from 17 artists, including Miyajima, who illustrated the cover and opening chapter.

Series overview

Episodes

BanG Dream! Girls Band Party! Pico (2018)

BanG Dream! Girls Band Party! Pico: Ohmori (2020)

BanG Dream! Girls Band Party! Pico Fever! (2021–2022)

Notes

References

External links
  
 English website
 Ohmori English website
 Fever! English website
 
 
 

2018 anime television series debuts
2020 anime television series debuts
Anime spin-offs
G
Sanzigen